Þráinn Hjálmarsson (Thrainn Hjalmarsson, born 1987) is an Icelandic composer.

Þráinn earned a bachelor's degree from the Iceland Academy of the Arts in 2009 and a master's degree in composition from the Royal Conservatory of The Hague in 2011. He is a member of the Icelandic composers' collective S.L.Á.T.U.R (Society of artistically obtrusive composers around Reykjavík).

The BBC Scottish Symphony Orchestra under Ilan Volkov performed his As Heard Across a Room as part of a concert of new Icelandic works in 2014; critics described it as "finespun"  and "paradox music: like trying to make out the structure of a void". His Lucid/Opaque (for string trio) was premiered by Nordic Affect at the annual Dark Music Days festival in 2016; a critic described it as "contain[ing] beautiful meditative stillness". Influence of buildings on musical tone for a chamber ensemble represented Iceland at the International Rostrum of Composers in Helsinki in 2014.

References

External links 
 Thrainn Hjalmarsson's website

Thrainn Hjalmarsson
Thrainn Hjalmarsson
1987 births
Contemporary classical composers
Royal Conservatory of The Hague alumni
21st-century classical composers
Living people
21st-century male musicians